Víctor Manuel Mendoza (1913–1995) was a Mexican film actor.

Selected filmography

 Almas rebeldes (1937)
 Ojos tapatios (1938) - Carlos
 Los bandidos de Río Frío (1938) - Juan Robreño
 While Mexico Sleeps (1938)
 Pescadores de perlas (1938) - Ignacio
 Sangre en las montañas (1938)
 Alma norteña (1939) - Agustín
 Rosa de Xochimilco (1939) - El marido
 ¡Ay Jalisco... no te rajes! (1941) - Felipe Carbajal
 Águila roja (1942) - Víctor Reyes
 Simón Bolívar (1942) - La Mar
 Beautiful Michoacán (1943) - Roque
 Santa (1943) - Marcelino
 El ametralladora (1943) - Felipe Carvajal
 Cuando habla el corazón (1943) - Cruz González
 Los amores de un torero (1945) - Ernesto
 Mulata de Córdoba (1945)
 Recuerdos de mi valle (1946)
 Pervertida (1946) - Humberto
 Cuando lloran los valientes (1947) - Coronel José Luis Arteche
 Los tres García (1947) - Luis Manuel García
 ¡Vuelven los García! (1947) - Luis Manuel García
 Mi madre adorada (1948)
 Flor de caña (1948) - Román
 Bamba (1949) - Lino Mena
 La panchita (1949) - Benjamín
 Tierra muerta (1949)
 Venus de fuego (1949)
 Pasión jarocha (1950)
 Tacos joven (1950)
 La tienda de la esquina (1951) - Víctor
 Susana (1951) - Jesús
 Nunca debieron amarse (1951) - Agustín
 Cartas a Ufemia (1952) - Ignacio Vélez
 Maria del Mar (1952) - Salvador
 La extraña pasajera (1953) - Rodolfo Castillo
 Reportaje (1953) - García, Press operator
 The Proud and the Beautiful (1954) - Don Rodrigo, Hotel Owner
 Garden of Evil (1954) - Vicente Madariaga
 The Black Pirates (1954) - Castro
 María la Voz (1955) - Pablo Canefa el Espejo
 El Túnel 6 (1955) - Gustavo
 La doncella de piedra (1956) - Demetrio Montiel de los Montieles
 Pueblo, canto y esperanza (1956) - El negro (colombian episode)
 Talpa (1956) - Tanilo
 Y si ella volviera (1957) - Guillermo Castro 
 Cowboy (1958) - Paco Mendoza - Ramrod
 The Wonderful Country (1959) - Gen. Marcos Castro
 La sombra del caudillo (1960) - General Elizondo
 Los hermanos Del Hierro (1961) - Fidencio Cruz
 La soldadera (1966) - Major Castro Virgen
 El caballo Bayo (1969)
 Las puertas del paraíso (1971)
 El tigre de Santa Julia (1974) - el Diablo
 La otra virginidad (1975) - Don Luis Romero Bracamontes, padre de Adrián
 Pantaleón y las visitadoras (1976)
 Traigo la sangre caliente (1977)
 El tren de la muerte (1979) - Sheriff
 Herencia de muerte (1981) - Rodolfo del Fierro
 La combi asesina (1982) - Anciano
 Historia de una mujer escandalosa (1984)
 ¡Ay Carmela! (1990) - Oficial
 Cartel de la droga (1990)
 Pedro infante vive? (1991) - Victor Manuel Mendoza (final film role)

References

Bibliography 
 Rogelio Agrasánchez. Guillermo Calles: A Biography of the Actor and Mexican Cinema Pioneer. McFarland, 2010.

External links 
 

1913 births
1995 deaths
Best Actor Ariel Award winners
Mexican male film actors
Male actors from Jalisco
20th-century Mexican male actors
People from Tala, Jalisco